Robert Watson Wood ( – ) was an American clergyman of the United Church of Christ, an early activist for LGBT rights and advocate for the LGBT community both before and after the pivotal Stonewall riots in the United States, and an author.

Wood was born in Youngstown, Ohio, on May 21, 1923. He enrolled at the University of Pennsylvania but left and enlisted in the United States Army to fight in World War II in North Africa and Italy with the 36th Infantry Division. He was severely wounded in battle, receiving the Bronze Star Medal for "heroic achievement in combat" and other military honors, and spent nearly two years medically recovering.

He returned to complete his bachelor's degree at Pennsylvania. There he encountered prejudice against his sexual orientation justified through Christian scripture and resolved to learn scripture and theology himself. He began his pastoral career after graduating from Oberlin Seminary in 1951 and being ordained by the Congregational Church at Fair Haven, Vermont.

He met his husband, Hugh M. Coulter, an artist and cowboy, in 1962. They remained together until Coulter's death in 1989.

In 1960 Wood's book Christ and the Homosexual was published by Vantage Press in New York. Although it was reviewed positively by gay publications and earned him an award from the Mattachine Society, it garnered little public attention at the time and sold approximately 3,000 copies. However, it was used as a reference for academic publications concerning gay culture.

In a long career as a pastor he officiated at many same-sex weddings and continuously advocated in both the Christian world and broader society for the rights and spiritual integrity of LGBT people. He died in Concord, New Hampshire, in 2018.

Works
Christ and the Homosexual (1960), New York, Vantage Press, pp 221

References

External links
"Reflections on the Rev. Robert Wood, a man of God and gay rights", a Concord Monitor retrospective podcast and interview with Bob Paradis and Rejean Blanchette, who cared for Wood during his final years (archive link; archived 2019-03-29)

1923 births
2018 deaths
American Christian clergy
American Christian theologians
United Church of Christ ministers
20th-century Congregationalist ministers
United States Army personnel of World War II
People from Youngstown, Ohio
People from Concord, New Hampshire
University of Pennsylvania alumni
LGBT Protestant clergy
LGBT people from Ohio
Oberlin College alumni
Writers from Ohio
Writers from New York City
20th-century American clergy